Vira Chorny-Meshkova (born 25 April 25 1963, Vojvodina) is a Ukrainian poet and translator based in Macedonia who has translated Ukrainian works into Macedonian and Macedonian works into Ukrainian. She was co-author of research entitled  "І пізнайте істину та істина визволить вас..." ("And know the truth and the truth will set you free ...") on the cultural ties between Macedonia and Ukraine. She translated her book Київські епіграми (Kiev Epigrams) into Ukrainian, and it was the first work to be published in Macedonia in the Ukrainian language. She is an activist for the Ukrainian diaspora in Macedonia.

She is a member of the National Writers' Union of Ukraine.

References

1963 births
Living people
Ukrainian poets
Ukrainian women writers
Translators from Macedonian
Translators from Ukrainian
Translators to Macedonian
Translators to Ukrainian
21st-century translators